John Joseph Havlicek (April 8, 1940 – April 25, 2019) was an American professional basketball player who spent his entire career with the NBA Boston Celtics, winning eight NBA championships, beginning with his first four seasons with the team.

Only teammates Bill Russell (11) and Sam Jones (10) won more. Havlicek is just one of four players to win 8, and one of three with an unsurpassed 8–0 record in NBA Finals. He is widely considered to have been one of the greatest players in the history of the game, and was inducted as a member of the Naismith Memorial Basketball Hall of Fame in 1984.

Early life
Havlicek was born in Martins Ferry, Ohio, where his parents ran a general store. He was of Czech and Croatian descent, from his father and mother respectively. Havlicek was a three-sport athlete at Bridgeport High School in Bridgeport, Ohio, where he was a boyhood friend of Baseball Hall of Famer Phil Niekro.

College career
Havlicek played college basketball at Ohio State University with future seven-time NBA All-Star Jerry Lucas, who was his roommate, future first-round NBA draft pick Larry Siegfried, future coaching legend Bobby Knight, and Mel Nowell, among many others. The 1960 Ohio State Buckeyes, coached by head coach Fred Taylor and assistant coaches Jack Graf and Frank Truitt, won the 1960 NCAA title. Havlicek was named as an alternate of the 1960 United States national team that competed in the 1960 Summer Olympics.

Professional career

Boston Celtics (1962–1978)
Havlicek was drafted by both the Boston Celtics of the National Basketball Association (NBA) and the Cleveland Browns of the National Football League in 1962. After competing briefly as a wide receiver in the Browns' training camp that year, he focused his energies on playing for the Celtics. A swingman who could play either guard or forward, he was known for his stamina, with competitors stating that it was a challenge just to keep up with him. Head coach Red Auerbach went on to call him "the guts of the team". Nicknamed "Hondo" (a nickname inspired by the 1953 movie of the same name starring John Wayne), Havlicek revolutionized the "sixth man" role in the NBA coming off the bench for the Celtics during his early years.

Havlicek was later immortalized for his clutch steal in the closing seconds of the 1965 Eastern Conference championship. In the seventh and final game, played at Boston Garden on April 15, the Celtics led the Philadelphia 76ers 110–109 with five seconds left. They only needed to inbound the ball from underneath their basket to secure the victory and advance to the 1965 NBA Finals. However, Bill Russell's pass struck one of the basket's support wires hanging down from the ceiling, leading to a turnover that gave the 76ers and Wilt Chamberlain the ball and a chance to win the game. Hal Greer was set to throw the inbounds pass for the 76ers. Havlicek stood with his back to Greer, guarding Chet Walker. But as Greer's pass came inbounds, Havlicek spun, leaped, and tipped the pass to Sam Jones. Veteran referee Earl Strom, who wrote about the game in his memoir Calling the Shots, called Havlicek's reaction one of the greatest plays he ever saw in his 32 years as a professional official. Announcer Johnny Most's call of "Havlicek stole the ball!" was dubbed by the NBA as "the most famous radio call in basketball history."

In Game 5 of the 1968 Eastern Division Finals, Havlicek recorded a near triple-double with 29 points, 9 rebounds, and 10 assists as the Celtics avoided elimination at the hands of the 76ers. He added a strong performance in Game 7, recording 21 points, 12 rebounds, and 8 assists in a 100–96 road win against the 76ers. In that series, the Celtics became the first NBA team to overcome a 3–1 playoff series deficit.

The Celtics won the 1974 NBA Championship, and Havlicek was named NBA Finals MVP.

With one second left in the second overtime of Game 5 of the 1976 NBA Finals, Havlicek made a leaning, running bank shot that appeared to be the game-winner. Phoenix called an illegal timeout, resulting in a technical foul shot converted by Jo Jo White. However, Phoenix still had one final possession, and Gar Heard scored for Phoenix to tie the game. The Celtics went on to win in triple overtime, which at the time was hailed as the greatest NBA finals game ever.

When he retired after the 1977–78 NBA season, Havlicek was the Celtics all-time leading scorer, a distinction still held at the time of his death in 2019. Besides his prolific scoring, he was a tenacious defender known for his ability to harass ballhandlers, create turnovers, and aggressively rebound for his size. He was named to five first team and three second team NBA all-defensive teams. Havlicek finished his sixteen-year career with eight NBA championships and thirteen all-star appearances.

Legacy
Havlicek retired in 1978 as a 13-time NBA All-Star, and his number 17 jersey was immediately retired by the Celtics. At the time, Havlicek was the NBA career leader in games played (a mark surpassed in 1984 by Elvin Hayes) and third in points behind Chamberlain and Oscar Robertson.

In 1980, Havlicek was selected as one of the league's greatest players ever, being named to the NBA 35th Anniversary Team. In 1984, Havlicek became a member of the Naismith Memorial Basketball Hall of Fame. In 1996, he was selected as one of the 50 Greatest Players in NBA History by a panel of journalists, players, coaches, executives, and general managers. He was also named the 14th best player of all-time in Bill Simmons's Book of Basketball. In October 2021, Havlicek was again honored as one of the league's greatest players of all time by being named to the NBA 75th Anniversary Team. To commemorate the NBA's 75th Anniversary, The Athletic ranked their top 75 players of all time, listing Havlicek as the 29th greatest player in NBA history.

Havlicek is the Celtics' all-time leading scorer with 26,395 points (20.8 points per game), which ranks 16th all-time in the NBA. He played in 1,270 games, which ranks 30th all-time. He was also the first player to score 1,000 points in 16 consecutive seasons, with his best scoring season coming during the 1970–71 season, when he averaged 28.9 points per game. In 1974, Havlicek received the Golden Plate Award of the American Academy of Achievement.

In 2007, Bridgeport High School in his hometown renamed their gymnasium "John J. Havlicek Gymnasium". Fellow NBA Hall of Famer Chris Mullin wore number 17 as a tribute to Havlicek.

In October 2022, Havlicek was inaugurated in the Croatian-American Sports Hall of Fame. Longtime Celtics teammate Bill Russell once described Havlicek as "'the best all-around ballplayer [he] ever saw'".

Post-playing career
Havlicek was shrewd with his money during his playing career, and he invested much of this income in the Wendy's fast food chain during its formative years. The success of his investments left Havlicek with a comfortable income after retirement and he never had to work for a conventional salary again. He had no desire to coach; instead, he served as a corporate speaker.

Havlicek was a member of the board of the Genesis Foundation, which assists children with disabilities and genetic disorders. He and his wife Beth held the John Havlicek Celebrity Fishing Tournament for more than three decades, with proceeds going to the foundation.

Personal life
Havlicek met his wife, Beth, while both were attending Ohio State University. The couple married in 1967. They had two children: a son named Chris and a daughter named Jill. Chris Havlicek attended the University of Virginia on a basketball scholarship in the early 1990s. Jill Havlicek married former Major League Baseball outfielder and coach Brian Buchanan.

Havlicek had Parkinson's disease during his last years. He died on April 25, 2019, in Jupiter, Florida at the age of 79.

NBA career statistics

Regular season

|-
| style="text-align:left; background:#afe6ba;"|†
| style="text-align:left;"|Boston
| style="background:#cfecec;"|80* ||  || 27.5 || .445 ||  || .728 || 6.7 || 2.2 ||   ||   || 14.3
|-
| style="text-align:left; background:#afe6ba;"|†
| style="text-align:left;"|Boston
| 80 ||  || 32.3 || .417 ||  || .746 || 5.4 || 3.0 ||   ||   || 19.9
|-
| style="text-align:left; background:#afe6ba;"|†
| style="text-align:left;"|Boston
| 75 ||  || 28.9 || .401 ||  || .744 || 4.9 || 2.7 ||   ||   || 18.3
|-
| style="text-align:left; background:#afe6ba;"|†
| style="text-align:left;"| Boston
| 71 ||  || 30.6 || .399 ||  || .785 || 6.0 || 3.0 ||   ||   || 18.8
|-
| style="text-align:left;"|
| style="text-align:left;"|Boston
| style="background:#cfecec;"|81* ||  || 32.1 || .444 ||  || .828 || 6.6 || 3.4 ||   ||   || 21.4
|-
| style="text-align:left; background:#afe6ba;"|†
| style="text-align:left;"|Boston
| 82 ||  || 35.6 || .429 ||  || .812 || 6.7 || 4.7 ||   ||   || 20.7
|-
| style="text-align:left; background:#afe6ba;"|†
| style="text-align:left;"|Boston
| 82 ||  || 38.7 || .405 ||  || .780 || 7.0 || 5.4 ||   ||   || 21.6
|-
| style="text-align:left;"|
| style="text-align:left;"|Boston
| 81 ||  || 41.6 || .464 ||  || .844 || 7.8 || 6.8 ||   ||   || 24.2
|-
| style="text-align:left;"|
| style="text-align:left;"|Boston
| 81 ||  || style="background:#cfecec;"|45.4* || .450 ||  || .818 || 9.0 || 7.5 ||   ||   || 28.9
|-
| style="text-align:left;"|
| style="text-align:left;"|Boston
| 82 ||  || style="background:#cfecec;"|45.1* || .458 ||  || .834 || 8.2 || 7.5 ||   ||   || 27.5
|-
| style="text-align:left;"|
| style="text-align:left;"|Boston
| 80 ||  || 42.1 || .450 ||  || .858 || 7.1 || 6.6 ||   ||   || 23.8
|-
| style="text-align:left; background:#afe6ba;"|†
| style="text-align:left;"|Boston
| 76 ||  || 40.7 || .456 ||  || .832 || 6.4 || 5.9 || 1.3 || .4 || 22.6
|-
| style="text-align:left;"|
| style="text-align:left;"|Boston
| 82 ||  || 38.2 || .455 ||  || .870 || 5.9 || 5.3 || 1.3 || .2 || 19.2
|-
| style="text-align:left; background:#afe6ba;"|†
| style="text-align:left;"|Boston
| 76 ||  || 34.2 || .450 ||  || .844 || 4.1 || 3.7 || 1.3 || .4 || 17.0
|-
| style="text-align:left;"|
| style="text-align:left;"|Boston
| 79 ||  || 36.9 || .452 ||  || .816 || 4.8 || 5.1 || 1.1 || .2 || 17.7
|-
| style="text-align:left;"|
| style="text-align:left;"|Boston
| 82 ||  || 34.1 || .449 ||  || .855 || 4.0 || 4.0 || 1.1 || .3 || 16.1
|- class="sortbottom"
| style="text-align:center;" colspan=2|Career 
| 1,270 ||  || 36.6 || .439 ||  || .815 || 6.3 || 4.8 || 1.2 || .3 || 20.8
|- class="sortbottom"
| style="text-align:center;" colspan=2|All-Star
| 13 || 10 || 23.3 || .481 ||  || .756 || 3.5 || 2.6 || .3 || .0 || 13.8

Playoffs

|-
| style="text-align:left; background:#afe6ba;"|1963†
| style="text-align:left;"|Boston
| 11 ||  || 23.1 || .448 ||  || .667 || 4.8 || 1.5 ||   ||   || 11.8
|-
| style="text-align:left; background:#afe6ba;"|1964†
| style="text-align:left;"|Boston
| 10 ||  || 28.9 || .384 ||  || .795 || 4.3 || 3.2 ||   ||   || 15.7
|-
| style="text-align:left; background:#afe6ba;"|1965†
| style="text-align:left;"|Boston
| 12 ||  || 33.8 || .352 ||  || .836 || 7.3 || 2.4 ||   ||   || 18.5
|-
| style="text-align:left; background:#afe6ba;"|1966†
| style="text-align:left;"|Boston
| 17 ||  || 42.3 || .409 ||  || .841 || 9.1 || 4.1 ||   ||   || 23.6
|-
| style="text-align:left;"|1967
| style="text-align:left;"|Boston
| 9 ||  || 36.7 || .448 ||  || .803 || 8.1 || 3.1 ||   ||   || 27.4
|-
| style="text-align:left; background:#afe6ba;"|1968†
| style="text-align:left;"|Boston
| 19 ||  || 45.4 || .452 ||  || .828 || 8.6 || 7.5 ||   ||   || 25.9
|-
| style="text-align:left; background:#afe6ba;"|1969†
| style="text-align:left;"|Boston
| 18 ||  || 47.2 || .445 ||  || .855 || 9.9 || 5.6 ||   ||   || 25.4
|-
| style="text-align:left;"|1972
| style="text-align:left;"|Boston
| 11 ||  || 47.0 || .460 ||  || .859 || 8.4 || 6.4 ||   ||   || 27.4
|-
| style="text-align:left;"|1973
| style="text-align:left;"|Boston
| 12 ||  || 39.9 || .477 ||  || .824 || 5.2 || 5.4 ||   ||   || 23.8
|-
| style="text-align:left; background:#afe6ba;"|1974†
| style="text-align:left;"|Boston
| 18 ||  || 45.1 || .484 ||  || .881 || 6.4 || 6.0 || 1.3 || .3 || 27.1
|-
| style="text-align:left;"|1975
| style="text-align:left;"|Boston
| 11 ||  || 42.2 || .432 ||  || .868 || 5.2 || 4.6 || 1.5 || .1 || 21.1
|-
| style="text-align:left; background:#afe6ba;"|1976†
| style="text-align:left;"|Boston
| 15 ||  || 33.7 || .444 ||  || .809 || 3.7 || 3.4 || .8 || .3 || 13.2
|-
| style="text-align:left;"|1977
| style="text-align:left;"|Boston
| 9 ||  || 41.7 || .371 ||  || .820 || 5.4 || 6.9 || .9 || .4 || 18.3
|- class="sortbottom"
| style="text-align:center;" colspan=2|Career
| 172 ||  || 39.9 || .436 ||  || .836 || 6.9 || 4.8 || 1.1 || .3 || 22.0

See also

 List of National Basketball Association career games played leaders
 List of National Basketball Association franchise career scoring leaders
 List of National Basketball Association career scoring leaders
 List of National Basketball Association career assists leaders
 List of National Basketball Association career free throw scoring leaders
 List of National Basketball Association career minutes played leaders
 List of National Basketball Association career playoff scoring leaders
 List of National Basketball Association career playoff assists leaders
 List of National Basketball Association career playoff free throw scoring leaders
 List of National Basketball Association single-game playoff scoring leaders
 List of NBA players who have spent their entire career with one franchise
 List of National Basketball Association annual minutes leaders
 List of NBA players with most championships

References

External links

 Havlicek's Basketball Hall of Fame profile

1940 births
2019 deaths
All-American college men's basketball players
American men's basketball players
American people of Croatian descent
American people of Czech descent
Basketball players from Ohio
Boston Celtics draft picks
Boston Celtics players
Naismith Memorial Basketball Hall of Fame inductees
National Basketball Association All-Stars
National Basketball Association broadcasters
National Basketball Association players with retired numbers
National Collegiate Basketball Hall of Fame inductees
Ohio State Buckeyes men's basketball players
People from Martins Ferry, Ohio
Small forwards
Neurological disease deaths in Florida
Deaths from Parkinson's disease